Nanorrhynchus is a genus of horse flies in the family Tabanidae.

Distribution
Turkmenistan, Uzbekistan, Kazakhstan.

Species
Nanorrhynchus crassinervis (Villeneuve, 1925)

References

Tabanidae
Diptera of Asia
Brachycera genera